East Blue Hill is an unincorporated village in the town of Blue Hill, Hancock County, Maine, United States.

References

Villages in Hancock County, Maine
Villages in Maine